The 2004 Suwon Samsung Bluewings season was Suwon Samsung Bluewings's ninth season in the K-League in Republic of Korea. Suwon Samsung Bluewings is competing in K-League, League Cup and Korean FA Cup.

Squad

Backroom Staff

Coaching Staff
Head Coach:  Cha Bum-Kun
Assistant Coach:  Marco Pezzaiuoli 
Coach:  Lee Lim-Saeng
GK Coach:  Cho Byung-Deuk
Playing Coach:  Seo Jung-Won
Physical Trainer:  Lee Chang-Yeop

Scouter
 Kim Soon-Ki
 Jung Kyu-Poong

Executive Office
Club Chairman:  Lee Yoon-Woo 
Managing Director:  Ahn Ki-Hyun

Honours

Club
K-League Winners

Individual
K-League MVP:  Nádson
K-League Manager of the Year:  Cha Bum-Kun
K-League Best XI:  Lee Woon-Jae,  Musa,  Kwak Hee-Ju,  Kim Do-Heon,  Kim Dae-Eui,  Nádson

References

External links
 Suwon Bluewings Official website

Suwon Samsung Bluewings seasons
Suwon Samsung Bluewings